Calathus gomerensis is a species of ground beetle from the Platyninae subfamily that is endemic to Canary Islands.

References

gomerensis
Beetles described in 1943
Endemic beetles of the Canary Islands